The 2022 Trafford Metropolitan Borough Council election to elect members of Trafford Metropolitan Borough Council in England took place on 5 May 2022. One third of the 63 seats were contested, with one additional seat also contested in Gorse Hill as a by-election owing to a councillor retiring mid-term.  Each successful candidate will serve a one-year term of office rather than the normal four-year term due to a boundary review to be implemented in 2023.

After the election, the composition of the council was:

Results

Asterisk denotes an incumbent councillor seeking re-election. Changes in vote share with 2021.

Summary

NOTE: The above statistics include seats won during a by-election.

Altrincham ward

Ashton upon Mersey ward

Bowdon ward

Broadheath ward

Brooklands ward

Bucklow-St. Martins ward

Clifford ward

Davyhulme East ward

Davyhulme West ward

Flixton ward

Gorse Hill ward

Hale Barns ward

Hale Central ward

Longford ward

Priory ward

Sale Moor ward

St. Mary's ward

Stretford ward

Timperley ward

Urmston ward

Village ward

References

Trafford
Trafford Council elections